The following lists events that happened during 1955 in Australia.

Incumbents

Monarch – Elizabeth II
Governor-General – Sir William Slim
Prime Minister – Robert Menzies
Chief Justice – Sir Owen Dixon

State Premiers
Premier of New South Wales – Joseph Cahill
Premier of Queensland – Vince Gair
Premier of South Australia – Thomas Playford IV
Premier of Tasmania – Robert Cosgrove
Premier of Victoria – John Cain I (until 7 June), then Henry Bolte
Premier of Western Australia – Albert Hawke

State Governors
Governor of New South Wales – Sir John Northcott
Governor of Queensland – Sir John Lavarack
Governor of South Australia – Sir Robert George
Governor of Tasmania – Sir Ronald Cross, 1st Baronet
Governor of Victoria – Sir Dallas Brooks
Governor of Western Australia – Sir Charles Gairdner

Events
 19 February – The Southeast Asia Treaty Organization (SEATO) is established at a meeting in Bangkok.
 22–28 February – 1955 Hunter Valley floods: Enormous flooding of the Hunter River and adjacent areas of the Murray–Darling basin causes loss of life and set many rainfall and streamflow records.
 19 April – Australian Labor Party split of 1955. Expelled members form the Australian Labor Party (Anti-Communist), predecessor of the Democratic Labor Party (DLP).
 28 May – A state election is held in Victoria. John Cain's Labor government is defeated by the Liberal and Country Party, led by Henry Bolte.
 August – Widespread floods and exceedingly persistent rainfall effect the southern fringe of the continent.
 12 August – The aircraft carrier HMAS Vengeance is returned to the British Royal Navy.
 21 August – The Consolidated Zinc Corporation announced it has discovered bauxite at Weipa, Queensland.
 28 October – The aircraft carrier  is commissioned into the Royal Australian Navy.
 16 November – The Adelaide suburb of Elizabeth, South Australia is established.
 23 November – The Cocos Islands in the Indian Ocean are transferred from British to Australian control.
 10 December – Federal election: The incumbent Liberal Party led by Prime Minister Robert Menzies with coalition partner the Country Party led by Arthur Fadden defeat the Labor Party led by H. V. Evatt. Malcolm Fraser first enters Parliament as Liberal member for Wannon.

Science and technology
 The Guthega power station becomes the first to generate electricity in the Snowy Mountains Scheme

Arts and literature

 28 November – Ray Lawler's Summer of the Seventeenth Doll receives its stage premiere by the Union Theatre Repertory Company in Melbourne with the playwright in a leading role; this is influential as the first authentically naturalistic modern drama in the theatre of Australia
 19 December – Dame Edna Everage makes her first stage appearance, in Melbourne
 John Brack paints The Car and Collins St., 5 pm in Oakleigh, Victoria
 Ivor Hele wins the Archibald Prize with his portrait of Robert Campbell Esq.
 Donald Friend wins the Blake Prize for Religious Art with his work St John and Scenes from the Apocalypse
 Patrick White's novel The Tree of Man is published
 Alan Marshall's childhood autobiography I Can Jump Puddles is published

Film
 Jedda, a film by Charles Chauvel, is released

Sport and recreation

 Board games
 19 January – Australian debut of Scrabble
 Cricket
 New South Wales wins the Sheffield Shield
 England defeats Australia 3–1 in The Ashes
 Football
 South Australian National Football League premiership: won by Port Adelaide
 Victorian Football League premiership: Melbourne defeated Collingwood 64–36
 Rugby
 Bledisloe Cup: won by the All Blacks
 Brisbane Rugby League premiership: Valleys defeat Brothers 17–7
 New South Wales Rugby League premiership: South Sydney defeat Newtown 12–11
 Golf
 Australian Open: won by Bobby Locke
 Australian PGA Championship: won by Ossie Pickworth
 Horse Racing
 Rising Fast wins the Caulfield Cup
 Kingster wins the Cox Plate
 Toparoa wins the Melbourne Cup
 Motor Racing
 The Australian Grand Prix is held at Port Wakefield and won by Jack Brabham driving a Cooper Bristol
 Tennis
 Australian Open men's singles: Ken Rosewall defeats Lew Hoad 9–7 6–4 6–4
 Australian Open women's singles: Beryl Penrose Collier defeats Thelma Coyne Long 6–4 6–3
 Davis Cup: Australia defeats the United States 5–0 in the 1955 Davis Cup final
 Wimbledon: Rex Hartwig and Lew Hoad win the Gentlemen's Doubles
 Yachting
 Even takes line honours and Moonbi wins on handicap in the Sydney to Hobart Yacht Race

Births
 1 January – Mario Andreacchio, film director
 6 January – Graham Murray, rugby league footballer and coach (died 2013)
 13 January – Paul Kelly, rock musician
 10 February – Greg Norman, golfer
 4 March – Tim Costello, Baptist minister and CEO of World Vision
 6 April - Ray Blacklock (died 2020), rugby league footballer
 23 April – Judy Davis, actress
 3 May – David Hookes (died 2004), cricketer
 31 May – Tommy Emmanuel, guitarist
 23 June – Alan J. Gow, motorsport executive
 5 July – Peter McNamara, tennis player
 24 July – David Smith, race walker
 27 July – Allan Border, cricketer
 5 August – Robert Flower (died 2014), footballer
 19 August – Mary-Anne Fahey, actress and comedian
 18 September - Jim Saleam, Far Right activist
 5 October – Wilbur Wilde, saxophonist
 8 October – Paul Lennon, Premier of Tasmania
 24 October – Katherine Knight, murderer
 11 December – David Atkins, actor and dancer
 19 December– Lincoln Hall (died 2012), mountain climber

Deaths
 10 May – John Radecki, stained-glass artist (born in Poland) (b. 1865)
 6 June – Max Meldrum, artist (born in the United Kingdom) (b. 1875)
 1 August – Charles Shaw, journalist and novelist (b. 1900)
 26 August – P.C. Anderson, golfer and educator (born in the United Kingdom) (b. 1871)
 5 September – Haydn Bunton Sr., Australian rules footballer (Fitzroy) (b. 1911)
 11 November – Harry Cobby, military aviator (b. 1894)
 19 December – Sir Keith Smith, aviator (b. 1890)

See also
 List of Australian films of the 1950s

References

 
Australia
Years of the 20th century in Australia